Radula is a genus of liverwort, and is the only genus in family Radulaceae.

It is a leafy liverwort. The appearance of the plants are as a scaly, green surface on the trunk of a tree, log or rock in a sheltered, moist out-door environment.  The leaves are rounded, overlapping and consist of two unequal lobes. The smaller lobe is folded beneath the larger one. The oldest fossil species is Radula cretacea from the Cenomanian aged Burmese amber of Myanmar, belonging to the subgenus Odontoradula. Molecular evidence suggests that the genus arose during the Triassic, around 227.8 Ma, and the crown group began to diversify during the Early Jurassic, around 176.3 Ma. 

Species include:
 Radula boninensis
 Radula carringtonii J.B.Jack
 Radula cavifolia
 Radula complanata
 Radula deflexilobula Promma, L.N.Zhang et R.L.Zhu
 Radula demissa M.A.M.Renner, 2013
 Radula javanica
 Radula jonesii Bouman, Dirkse & Yamada
 Radula kojana
 Radula laxiramea
 Radula marginata
 Radula obtusiloba
 Radula perrottetii
 Radula visianica C. Massal.

References

External links 
 

Porellales
Porellales genera